The Portuguese term praxe ( from the Greek πρᾶξις, praxis) describes the whole of student traditions in universities or, more often, to the initiation rituals freshmen are subjected to in some Portuguese universities.
Praxe is replicated by other higher education institutions across the country. Examples include Queima das Fitas and its parade, the Cortejo da Queima, the Festa das Latas and the Latada, where the freshmen walk throughout the streets with cans on their feet, and the ripping of the traditional academic suit of the students when they finish their first cycle of studies. Its roots go as far back as the 14th century, but it became most known in the 16th, under the name of the "Investidas", in the University of Coimbra, the oldest of its kind in the country. The praxe is meant to initiate the freshmen into the University institution and to encourage the loss of social inhibitions. Tradition, ritual, humor, joy and parody are some of the main ingredients of Praxe. Older students tend to produce funny situations and jokes with the freshmen; giving a warm welcome to them through initiation rituals. In most Portuguese higher education institutions, girls and boys have some gender-separated rituals to preserve dignity and respect. Most of the freshmen's rituals are performed collectively in order to avoid open ground for abusers. However, the older students sometimes take the Praxe too far, when the initiation rituals, jokes and traditions are degraded into humiliation and violence, a violation of the code and values of the praxe. The president of the Associação Académica de Coimbra and the Dux Veteranorum of Coimbra (ruling body of the Praxe in Coimbra) has described such incidents as a stain in its principles, and supports legal action being taken against perpetrators. One of the mottos of Praxe is Dura Praxis Sed Praxis (Latin for the Praxe is harsh, but it is the Praxe, like dura lex sed lex). These incidents have led to criticism against the Praxe, and the creation of student organizations against it.

With the spread of higher education institutions throughout Portugal in the last quarter of the twentieth century, the concept of Praxe became different from university to university. Coimbra and Porto claim to maintain the heritage of the real academic traditions, usually in contrast of new practices instituted in younger universities and higher education schools.

An increasingly larger number of institutions organize alternative initiation events for the freshmen based on solidarity activities and community work – it is called "Solidarity Praxis" (Praxe Solidária).

History 
The roots of the Praxe date back to the 14th century, when practiced by the clergy, which greatly influenced the design of the academic outfit,  but it did not attain recognition until the practice spread to Coimbra, first being named the Investidas, in the 16th century, upon the establishment of the university.
From Coimbra, the tradition spread into Lisbon and Porto in the 19th century, when those cities gained access to higher education, and students from those same cities transferred closer to home and brought the praxe and its customs with them. The Praxe is known everywhere in Portugal, being replicated inside higher education institutions of any kind and origin across the entire country. The process repeated itself, as more and more cities across the country had access to higher education, and today the traditions and costumes of the praxe are replicated nationwide, with each particular university or other higher education institution, having its own specific rituals and practices, and some praxe-related organizations have even attained international reach as well. The ritual burning of the ribbons of Queima das Fitas, the tradition of ripping and tearing of the newly graduates academic suit, the Festa das Latas with its Latada parade, the Cortejo da Queima parade of Queima das Fitas, among many other rituals, festivals and traditions, are examples of events which are associated with Praxe.

Academic outfit 
The academic outfit, in Portuguese "Traje Académico", being composed of a cassock, black pants, a black straight tie or bowtie of the same colour, a black vest with a back buckle (If one wears the bowtie, the vest is excluded) and a simple white shirt, without motifs or cuff links, buttons of the same colour and one pocket on the left side, along with black classical shoes and a straight black cloak for men. Women's outfits are composed of white straight shirt, and like the male one, without cuff links, a black jacket with two pockets, a skirt, equally black, black tie and stockings and low heeled shoes. The outfit, originally created for the students of the University of Coimbra, is a key part of the praxe symbolising equality, respect and humility. It originated from the original outfits monks wore,  demonstrating the influence of the clergy on the education, which lasted up until the 18th century, having maintained a very similar appearance to the original up until the 19th, when the more significant changes occurred, such as the shortening of the cassock and, by the end of the century, the definite presence of the long pants. 

There are some myths surrounding this outfit, such as the belief that the cloak should not be washed, because it represents the giving up of the memories of the academic life. This one in particular has been since clarified by Conselho de Veteranos of University of Coimbra (the council responsible to protect Praxe Académica) explaining students should actually wash it for hygienic purposes, and since historically students were recommended to look presentable while attending classes. The wearer can ask someone special to tear a little of their cloak, to symbolize that person's importance during the student's academic life. The cloak is also used to show respect to places one is in or a person someone is in the presence of, and the maximum demonstration of academic respect is the laying down of the cloak on the ground for someone to walk on top of.

Even though Coimbra's academic outfit is the traditional one and considered the symbol of a Portuguese student of higher education, some Portuguese higher education institutions have their typical academic outfit which differs greatly from that born in the ancient University of Coimbra. This is the case, for example, of those worn by the students of the University of the Algarve and Minho University.

Controversies

Criticism 
However, the civilised post-modern Praxe Académica has been corrupted, misused, and abused by some groups of students, regardless of whether they belong to large ancient institutions or to the smaller ones.  Some Praxe rituals have been accused of going against the principles set in the modern codes of the praxe, more akin to hazing-like sadistic practices meant to humiliate and demean the freshmen.

The tone of criticism around Praxe, however, may sometimes reach levels of "excessive humour", in response to what happens with excessive Praxe practices.

Judicial proceedings 
In the 2000s, the Ministry of Higher Education, Mariano Gago, was called by students who wished to see justice applied against abusers, as the institutions themselves ignored their complaints. The first case of abuse in the Praxe involving court action against 6 perpetrators, happened in 2003 at an agricultural polytechnic institution from Santarém – the Escola Agrária de Santarém of the Instituto Politécnico de Santarém involving – among other things – forced facial contact with pig excrement. Driven by a driver of the polytechnic, a van from the school was used in the process. In 2008, the students were convicted of the crimes of bodily harm and coercion. Other noted case happened in Bragança at the Escola Superior de Tecnologia e Gestão of the Instituto Politécnico de Bragança. Other case involved a female student of the Instituto Piaget, a private higher education institution – in December 2008, the court required the Instituto Piaget to pay nearly 40,000 euros to the student.

Among the sadistic practices sometimes found in praxe, specific humiliations of the freshmen by older students are the most common, such as by forcing them to perform large numbers of push ups, "kiss the ground", or stand in uncomfortable positions for prolonged amounts of time. There are also more extreme events, such as accounts of violence, for instance, when two freshmen from the University of Coimbra were assaulted by older students, which created a strong wave of criticism inside the Associação Académica de Coimbra. In another case, eight freshmen had to hide from a mob of older students to avoid being hurt (incident which later resulted in police intervention).  There are also instances where sexual acts are simulated between older students and freshmen, the older students taking the form of the active participant. Not participating in the praxe also warrants consequences to the freshman in question, such as not being able to participate in praxe-related traditions and activities and being actively discriminated from academic life, as freshmen are encouraged to set aside and discriminate those who are anti-praxe.

In 2001, Diogo Macedo, a 4th year Architecture student of the Universidade Lusíada of Vila Nova de Famalicão would die from wounds resulting of massive trauma to his spine which the coroner would rule as having been dealt by a blunt object during a praxe event.

Judicial proceedings would come to find that the university was guilty of not supervising such events on campus grounds and award the parents of the deceased student 90,000 euros. Two suspects were arraigned as defendants but in 2004 the case would be closed due to insufficient evidence to proceed any further. 

On the night of 15 December 2013, six members of an academic troupe of the Universidade Lusófona de Humanidades e Tecnologias would drown after being caught by a rogue wave on the Meco beach with the sole survivor, João Gouveia, Dux Veteranorum of the Universidade Lusófona de Humanidades e Tecnologias of Lisbon alleging temporary amnesia regarding the events, over allegations of the students having been caught by the wave while performing a ritual related to praxe and academic tradition João Gouveia would go on to be judged as to whether he was guilty of reckless endangerment.

On 23 April 2014, during an in praxe course face off between Informatics Engineering students and Medicine students at Gualtar Campus, part of Universidade do Minho, four freshmen of Informatics Engineering climbed a 4 meter wide by one and a half meter tall concrete wall to celebrate their victory. The wall end up collapsing in a few seconds, crushing to death three other Informatics Engineering male students between the ages of 18 and 21, that were standing at the bottom. The veteran students present were accused of homicide by negligence from the Public Ministry, but end up being absolved by the Braga Court.

On the night of 23 September 2015 a female freshman of the Universidade do Algarve would end up being hospitalized in an alcoholic coma, after hazing rituals in Faro which involved burying the freshmen in the beach and forcing them to drink alcoholic beverages. After the event the university started an internal investigation to determine disciplinary procedures to those involved. The state prosecution proceeded to open an inquiry regarding the events.

See also 
 Bullying
 Deposition (university)
 Higher education in Portugal
 Hazing
 Initiation
 University of Coimbra
 Homecoming
 Orientation week

References

External links 
 Praxe Wiki 
 "Academia de Submissos", Youtube documentary film 
 "DUX" - José Pedro Vasconcelos - 5 Para a Meia Noite 

Culture in Coimbra
Education in Portugal
Rites of passage
Portuguese traditions